The Cool School is a 1960 album by June Christy of songs sung by children the world over accompanied by the Joe Castro Quartet.  June’s daughter Shay (then aged 5) was pictured on the LP/CD cover wearing a blue smock.

The album was re-issued in 2006 as a double-CD together with Do-Re-Mi.

Track listing
 “Give a Little Whistle” (Leigh Harline, Ned Washington)
 “Magic Window” (Jimmy Van Heusen, Johnny Burke)
 “Baby’s Birthday Party” (Ann Ronell)
 “When You Wish upon a Star” (Leigh Harline, Ned Washington)
 “Baubles, Bangles, & Beads” (Robert Wright, Chet Forrest) 
 “Aren't You Glad You're You?” (Jimmy Van Heusen, Johnny Burke)
 “Kee-mo, ky-mo” (Bob Hilliard, Roy Alfred)
 “Scarlet Ribbons (For Her Hair)” (Evelyn Danzig, Jack Segal)
 “Looking for a Boy” (George Gershwin, Ira Gershwin)
 “Small Fry” (Hoagy Carmichael, Frank Loesser)
 “Ding-Dong! The Witch Is Dead” (Harold Arlen, Yip Harburg)
 “Swinging on a Star” (Jimmy Van Heusen, Johnny Burke)

Personnel
 June Christy - vocals
The Joe Castro Quartet
 Joe Castro - piano
 Howard Roberts - guitar
 Leroy Vinnegar - bass
 Larry Bunker - drums

References

June Christy albums
1960 albums
Capitol Records albums
Concept albums